Allium lojaconoi, common name  Maltese dwarf garlic, is a species of wild garlic endemic to the Republic of Malta in the Mediterranean. The species was first described in 1982 by Salvatore Brullo, E. Lanfranco and Pietro Pavone. It is closely related to A. parciflorum, from Sardinia and Corsica.

Description
Allium lojaconoi is a perennial bulb plant. It is extremely delicate and only 5 to 10 centimeters high. The flowering time is summer. The inflorescence is a loose capitulum with four to twelve stalked flowers. The flowers are brown-purple to pink in colour, with a central dark stripe on each petal. The plant has 16 chromosomes (2n).

Occurrence
Allium lojaconoi usually grows on rocky ground near the coast, on all three of the major islands of the country (Malta, Gozo and Comino). The species is reported as rare.

References

lojaconoi
Garlic
Flora of Malta
Plants described in 1982